The 2008–09 National Division Three North was the tenth and last season (twenty-second overall)  of the fourth division (north) of the English domestic rugby union competition using the name National Division Three North.  The division was set to be re-branded National League 2 North for the following season due to an RFU reshuffle of the entire league system.  New teams to the division included Halifax and Nuneaton who were relegated from the 2007–08 National Division Two while promoted sides included Loughborough Students who came up as champions of Midlands Division 1 along with Kendal (champions) Huddersfield (playoffs) coming up from North Division 1.  A further, final change to the division saw Rugby Lions transfer across to 2008–09 National Division Three South as the most southerly side in the division in order to address a team imbalance between the two leagues.  The league system was 4 points for a win, 2 points for a draw and additional bonus points being awarded for scoring 4 or more tries and/or losing within 7 points of the victorious team. In terms of promotion the league champions would go straight up into what would be known as National League 1 from 2009-10 but unlike previous years, there would be no promotion playoff between the runners up of the division and the runners up of National Division Three South due to the league restructuring.

Nuneaton made it an instant return to the (newly named) 2009–10 National League 1 winning the league title and promotion ahead of nearest rivals Caldy who finished 9 points behind without the consolation of the usual north-south playoff.  At the opposite end of the table Halifax suffered their second consecutive relegation being comfortably the worst team in the league with just 1 win and 1 draw for their efforts.  Much more competitive but ultimately 8 points worse off than next highest team were Darlington Mowden Park who were relegated despite finishing runners up the previous season (narrowly losing in the playoffs).  Darlington Mowden Park would drop down to the newly named National League 3 North (previously North Division 1).  The second relegated team, Halifax, were initial supposed to join Darlington Mowden Park in that division but due to financial difficulties the club decided to drop out of the national leagues and start as an amateur club in Yorkshire 6 - the lowest level the club could drop to.

Participating teams and locations

Final league table

Results

Round 1

Round 2

Round 3

Round 4

Round 5 

Postponed.  Game rescheduled to 16 May 2009.

Round 6

Round 7 

Postponed.  Game rescheduled to 11 April 2009.

Round 8

Round 9

Round 10

Round 11 

Postponed.  Game rescheduled to 17 January 2009.

Round 12 

Postponed.  Game rescheduled to 14 March 2009.

Postponed.  Game rescheduled to 14 March 2009.

Postponed.  Game rescheduled to 25 April 2009.

Round 13

Round 14 

Postponed.  Game rescheduled to 11 April 2009.

Postponed.  Game rescheduled to 17 January 2009.

Postponed.  Game rescheduled to 11 April 2009.

Postponed.  Game rescheduled to 2 May 2009.

Postponed.  Game rescheduled to 17 January 2009.

Round 15 

Postponed.  Game rescheduled to 9 May 2009.

Postponed.  Game rescheduled to 17 January 2009.

Postponed.  Game rescheduled to 25 April 2009.

Postponed.  Game rescheduled to 25 April 2009.

Postponed.  Game rescheduled to 11 April 2009.

Postponed.  Game rescheduled to 9 May 2009.

Postponed.  Game rescheduled to 14 March 2009.

Rounds 11, 14 & 15 (rescheduled games) 

Game rescheduled from 29 November 2008.

Game rescheduled from 10 January 2009.

Game rescheduled from 3 January 2009.

Game rescheduled from 3 January 2009.

Round 16

Round 17

Round 18 

Postponed.  Game rescheduled to 2 May 2009.

Postponed.  Game rescheduled to 2 May 2009.

Postponed.  Game rescheduled to 14 March 2009.

Postponed.  Game rescheduled to 2 May 2009.

Postponed.  Game rescheduled to 2 May 2009.

Round 19 

Postponed.  Game rescheduled to 5 May 2009.

Postponed.  Game rescheduled to 9 May 2009.

Round 20

Round 21 

Postponed.  Game rescheduled to 25 April 2009.

Round 22

Rounds 12, 15 & 18 (rescheduled games) 

Game rescheduled from 6 December 2008.

Game rescheduled from 6 December 2008.

Game rescheduled from 7 February 2009.

Game rescheduled from 10 January 2009.

Round 23

Round 24

Round 25

Rounds 7, 14 & 15 (rescheduled games) 

Game rescheduled from 3 January 2009.

Game rescheduled from 3 January 2009.

Game rescheduled from 25 October 2008.

Game rescheduled from 10 January 2009.

Round 26

Rounds 12, 15 & 21 (rescheduled games) 

Game rescheduled from 10 January 2009.

Game rescheduled from 10 January 2009.

Game rescheduled from 6 December 2008.

Game rescheduled from 28 February 2009.

Rounds 14 & 18 (rescheduled games) 

Game rescheduled from 7 February 2009.

Game rescheduled from 7 February 2009.

Game rescheduled from 3 January 2009.

Game rescheduled from 7 February 2009.

Game rescheduled from 7 February 2009.

Round 19 (rescheduled game)

Game rescheduled from 14 February 2009.

Rounds 15 & 19 (rescheduled games) 

Game rescheduled from 10 January 2009.

Game rescheduled from 14 February 2009.

Game rescheduled from 10 January 2009.

Round 5 (rescheduled game) 

Game rescheduled from 4 October 2008.

Total season attendances

Individual statistics 

 Note if players are tied on tries or points the player with the lowest number of appearances will come first.  Also note that points scorers includes tries as well as conversions, penalties and drop goals.

Top points scorers

Top try scorers

Season records

Team
Largest home win — 80 pts
83 - 3  Leicester Lions at home to Halifax on 11 April 2009
Largest away win — 68 pts
68 - 0  Kendal away to Bradford & Bingley on 9 May 2009
Most points scored — 83 pts
83 - 3  Leicester Lions at home to Halifax on 11 April 2009
Most tries in a match — 13
Leicester Lions at home to Halifax on 11 April 2009
Most conversions in a match — 9
Leicester Lions at home to Halifax on 11 April 2009
Most penalties in a match — 8
Huddersfield away to Halifax on 3 January 2009
Most drop goals in a match — 3 (x2)
Nuneaton at home to Macclesfield on 11 October 2008
Nuneaton away to Bradford & Bingley on 29 November 2008

Player
Most points in a match — 30 (x2)
 Gareth Collins for Leicester Lions away to Bradford & Bingley on 7 March 2009
 Gareth Collins for Leicester Lions at home to Halifax on 11 April 2009
Most tries in a match — 6 (x2)
 Gareth Collins for Leicester Lions away to Bradford & Bingley on 7 March 2009
 Gareth Collins for Leicester Lions at home to Halifax on 11 April 2009
Most conversions in a match — 9
 Jon Boden for Leicester Lions at home to Halifax on 11 April 2009
Most penalties in a match — (x6)
 Ross Winney for Macclesfield at home to Hull Ionians on 6 September 2008
 Rickie Aley for Nuneaton away to Harrogate on 4 October 2008
 Jon Benson for Darlington Mowden Park at home to Fylde on 7 March 2009
Most drop goals in a match — 3 (x2)
 Rickie Aley for Nuneaton at home to Macclesfield on 11 October 2008
 Rickie Aley for Nuneaton away to Bradford & Bingley on 29 November 2008

Attendances
Highest — 1,644 
Fylde at home to Hull Ionians on 21 March 2009
Lowest — 65
Loughborough Students at home to Huddersfield on 29 November 2008
Highest Average Attendance — 590
Fylde
Lowest Average Attendance — 131
Leicester Lions

See also
 English Rugby Union Leagues
 English rugby union system
 Rugby union in England

References

External links
 NCA Rugby

2008-09
2008–09 in English rugby union leagues